"It's My Life" is a song by Nigerian-Swedish recording artist Dr. Alban. It was released in February 1992 in Sweden as the first single from his second studio album, One Love (1992). Produced by Denniz PoP, who also co-wrote the song, it was a hit in most of the European countries where it was released, peaking at number one in Sweden, Austria, Germany, Italy, the Netherlands and Belgium and number two in the UK. In France, the song was marketed twice: first in 1992, then in 1993 because the song was used in a TV advert for Tampax tampons (as it was in the UK and other countries in Europe in 1992), thus giving to the single a second career. The song had enough airplay on US college radio stations to chart on the Billboard Modern Rock Tracks in 1992. "It's My Life" was re-released in 1994 in Australia, following the success of "Sing Hallelujah!".

Background
Dr. Alban has stated that the song took five hours to record. In the 2017 book Stars of 90's Dance Pop: 29 Hitmakers Discuss Their Careers by James Arena, he explained on the new sound of the song: "'It's My Life' and another hit off the second album, 'Sing Hallelujah!', had totally different sounds [compared to his 1990 debut single "Hello Afrika"], which I wanted to explore at the time. I left the 'Hello Afrika' sound and did 'It's My Life', which had more of a pop, catchy style. Keeping things fresh was very natural for us."

Critical reception
Larry Flick from Billboard magazine called "It's My Life" "a fast'n'furious cut". He explained that the European rapper/toaster has previously been heralded for his sturdy dancehall releases. "This time, however, he aims for mainstream approval with a gem of a jam that carefully skirts the line dividing hi-NRG and rave sectors. Anthemic chants are placed within a percolating vat of keyboard and percussion effects that will kick during peak-hour sets." Linda Ryan from the Gavin Report viewed it as a "mad creation". Alan Jones from Music Week commented, "A highly commercial house track, recorded in Sweden, it's basically a West Indian accented rap punctuated at regular intervals by a catchy chorus. Probable Top 10 hit." R.S. Murthi from New Straits Times described the song as "a righteous declaration of independence" and added that it shows "a genuine attempt at depth." Mark Frith from Smash Hits complimented it as "a half-decent Euro-pop tune" that "will be remembered as an essential part of the music of summer '92."

Chart performance
"It's My Life" made a huge impact on the charts in Europe, becoming one of Dr. Alban's most successful songs to date. It peaked at number-one in Austria, Belgium, Germany, Italy, the Netherlands and Sweden, as well as on the Eurochart Hot 100, where it peaked in October 1992. In addition, the single made it to the top 10 in Denmark (3), Finland (5), Greece (2), Ireland (2), Norway (6), Portugal (9), Switzerland (2) and the United Kingdom. In the latter, it peaked at number two on 20 September 1992, in its fourth week on the UK Singles Chart. It was held off reaching the top spot by The Shamen's "Ebeneezer Goode". 

Outside Europe, "It's My Life" reached number two on the Canadian RPM Dance/Urban chart, number three on the US Billboard Hot Dance Club Play chart and number 10 in Zimbabwe. In Australia and New Zealand, it was a top 50 hit, peaking at number 43 and 49, respectively. 

The song was awarded with a silver record in France, after 125,000 units were sold, and a platinum record in Austria and Germany, with a sale of 30,000 and 500,000 singles.

Track listings
 7-inch and CD single
"It's My Life" (radio edit) – 4:00
"It's My Life" (club edit) – 4:10

 12-inch single
"It's My Life" (extended club mix) – 7:45
"It's My Life" (extended radio edit) – 7:05
"It's My Life" (radio edit) – 4:00

 CD maxi
 "It's My Life" (radio edit) – 4:00
 "It's My Life" (extended radio edit) – 7:05
 "It's My Life" (extended club mix) – 7:45

Personnel
Composers
John Amatiello – composer
Chuck Anthony – composer, backing vocals
Dr. Alban – composer
Jörgen Elofsson – composer
Peo Haggstrom – composer
Kristian Lundin – composer
Sonny Okosun – composer
Todd Terry – composer
Errol Thompson – composer
Jorge Vasconcelo – composer

Vocals
Dr. Alban – primary artist
Chuck Anthony – background vocals
Atari
Kofi Benitez & The Girls – background vocals
Anneli Berg – background vocals
Marilyn Bergman – background vocals
Giovanna Bragazza – background vocals
Gladys del Pilar – background vocals
Toro Paola Choir – background vocals
Poe & The Afrikan Conga Association – background vocals
Rico – background vocals
Bjorn Strom – background vocals

Technical
Douglas Carr – engineer, producer
Björn Engelmann – mastering
Anders Hansson	– arranger
Rene "JM Fax" Hedemyr – producer
Denniz Pop – producer
Gundars Rullis – engineer

Charts

Weekly charts

Year-end charts

Decade-end charts

Certifications and sales

Release history

"It's My Life (Don't Worry)"

In 2014, a remake of the song was released by Moroccan singer Chawki featuring vocals by Dr. Alban. The song with amended lyrics also known as "It's My Life (Don't Worry)" was produced by RedOne and released on RedOne Records. A music video was also shot for the release. The single charted in the French SNEP official Singles Chart.

Chawki also released a bilingual English/French version of the song titled "It's My Life (C'est Ma Vie)".

Charts

References

It's My Life (Don't Worry)
It's My Life (Don't Worry)
1992 singles
1992 songs
1993 singles
Dr. Alban songs
Electro songs
House music songs
Reggae fusion songs
Ariola Records singles
Arista Records singles
Logic Records singles
Number-one singles in Austria
Dutch Top 40 number-one singles
European Hot 100 Singles number-one singles
Number-one singles in Israel
Number-one singles in Italy
Number-one singles in Germany
Number-one singles in Sweden
Songs written by Denniz Pop
Song recordings produced by Denniz Pop
Songs written by Dr. Alban
English-language Swedish songs
Ahmed Chawki songs
Eurodance songs
French-language songs
Arabic-language songs
Macaronic songs
Song recordings produced by RedOne